Gymnothorax annasona is a moray eel found in the southwest Pacific Ocean, around Lord Howe Island and Norfolk Island. It was first named by Whitley in 1937, and is commonly known as the Lord Howe Island moray or the Lord Howe moray.

References

annasona
Fish described in 1937
Fish of the Pacific Ocean